In graph theory, a connected graph  is said to be -vertex-connected (or -connected) if it has more than  vertices and remains connected whenever fewer than  vertices are removed.

The vertex-connectivity, or just connectivity, of a graph is the largest  for which the graph is -vertex-connected.

Definitions 
A graph (other than a complete graph) has connectivity k if k is the size of the smallest subset of vertices such that the graph becomes disconnected if you delete them. Complete graphs are not included in this version of the definition since they cannot be disconnected by deleting vertices. The complete graph with n vertices has connectivity n − 1, as implied by the first definition.

An equivalent definition is that a graph with at least two vertices is k-connected if, for every pair of its vertices, it is possible to find k vertex-independent paths connecting these vertices; see Menger's theorem . This definition produces the same answer, n − 1, for the connectivity of the complete graph Kn.

A 1-connected graph is called connected; a 2-connected graph is called biconnected. A 3-connected graph is called triconnected.

Applications

Polyhedral combinatorics 
The 1-skeleton of any k-dimensional convex polytope forms a k-vertex-connected graph (Balinski's theorem). As a partial converse, Steinitz's theorem states that any 3-vertex-connected planar graph forms the skeleton of a convex polyhedron.

Computational complexity 

See also
 k-edge-connected graph
 Connectivity (graph theory)
 Menger's theorem
 Structural cohesion
 Tutte embedding
 Vertex separator

Notes

References
.
.

Graph connectivity
Graph families